Edmond Jacques Eckel House is a historic home located at St. Joseph, Missouri.  It was designed by the architect Edmond Jacques Eckel (1845–1934) and built in 1885.  It is a -story, brick dwelling with a truncated hipped roof. It measures 25 feet wide and 36 feet deep.  It features a small, flat roofed, wood entrance portico with Tuscan order columns. Per the 2021 Google Street View, the house has been replaced by a parking lot. 

It was listed on the National Register of Historic Places in 1980.  It is located in the Robidoux Hill Historic District.

References

Individually listed contributing properties to historic districts on the National Register in Missouri
Houses on the National Register of Historic Places in Missouri
Houses completed in 1885
Houses in St. Joseph, Missouri
National Register of Historic Places in Buchanan County, Missouri